The men's freestyle welterweight was a freestyle wrestling event held as part of the Wrestling at the 1928 Summer Olympics programme. It was the third appearance of the event. Welterweight was the median category, including wrestlers weighing up to 72 kilograms. Arvo Haavisto, a 1924 bronze medalist in the lightweight category, won the tournament.

Results
Source: Official results; Wudarski

Gold medal round

Silver medal round

Bronze medal round

References

Wrestling at the 1928 Summer Olympics